Clay Hill or Clayhill may refer to:

Places

England
Clay Hill, Berkshire
Clay Hill, Bristol
Clay Hill, London, a suburb in Enfield, London
The historical name of Shortlands, Bromley, London
Clayhill Brook, a river in Berkshire

United States
Clay Hill, Alabama

Clay Hill, Florida
Clay Hill (Massachusetts)
Clay Hill (New York)

Canada
Clay Hills, Ontario

People
Clay Hill (lacrosse) (born 1976), Canadian lacrosse player
Clayhill, a British folk band

See also
Cley Hill, Wiltshire, England

Hill, Clay